The 2015 Puerto Rico Soccer League season did not take place in 2015. Teams then participated in the 2nd Excellence Cup, which was established in its place for the season.

PRSL 2nd Excellence Cup

References 

2015 in association football
2015 in Puerto Rican football
Puerto Rico Soccer League seasons